The Filmfare Best Director Award is given by the Filmfare magazine as part of its annual Filmfare Awards South for Malayalam films.

Superlatives

Winners

References

External links 

Filmfare Awards South (Malayalam)